Sarah Ann Walsh (born 11 January 1983)  is a retired Australian soccer player who most recently captained Western Sydney Wanderers FC in Australia's W-League. She is a former member of the Australia women's national soccer team, the Matildas.  she is Football Australia's Head of Women's Football, Women's World Cup Legacy & Inclusion, and in November 2021 she was appointed as co-chair of the inaugural National Indigenous Advisory Group of Football Australia.

Early life
Walsh was born in Camden, New South Wales.

Playing career

Club

Women's Professional Soccer, 2009
Walsh was selected in the first round of the Women's Professional Soccer league's international draft in 2009 by Sky Blue FC. On 26 June 2009, Walsh was dealt to the Saint Louis Athletica.  She had played in 5 games, 4 of them being starts (351 minutes) before being traded.  She also added a goal and an assist for Sky Blue FC.

Western Sydney Wanderers FC, 2012–13
In October 2012 it was announced that Walsh had signed for Western Sydney Wanderers FC in the Westfield W-League in Australia for the 2012–13 season. She was promptly elected Captain by the team members.

International
Walsh represented Australia at the 2004 Olympics, 2006 AFC Women's Asian Cup and the 2007 FIFA Women's World Cup.

On 30 August 2012, Walsh announced her international retirement and stated that her last game would be an upcoming friendly match against the United States on 19 September 2012. After scoring a goal in the friendly, Walsh ended her international career when she was substituted out in the 54th minute.

Sports administration and other roles
Walsh is a representative of the Professional Footballers Association's Matildas Delegates’ Committee alongside Melissa Barbieri, Lauren Colthorpe, Heather Garriock and Kate McShea.  On 20 January 2010, the Committee and Football Federation Australia announced a new pay deal for the Matildas to take them through to the 2010 AFC Women's Asian Cup football.

 she is Football Australia's Head of Women's Football, Women's World Cup Legacy & Inclusion. In November 2021 she was appointed as co-chair of the inaugural National Indigenous Advisory Group of Football Australia. The group aims at supporting and increasing Indigenous participation in the game.

Personal life
Walsh began dating American soccer player Megan Rapinoe in 2009 while they both played for the WPS. After approximately five years together, Rapinoe and Walsh ended their relationship in 2013.

In popular culture
In June 2011, Walsh was on the cover of the Australian FourFourTwo magazine along with fellow Matildas Melissa Barbieri, Sam Kerr, Thea Slatyer and Kyah Simon.

Career statistics

International goals
Scores and results list Australia's goal tally first.

Honours

Club
Sydney FC:
 W-League Premiership: 2009
 W-League Championship: 2009

International
Australia
 AFC Women's Asian Cup: 2010

References

External links
 
 Australia Football player profile
 Sydney FC player profile
 Saint Louis Athletica player profile
 Institute of Sport player profile

1983 births
Living people
Australian women's soccer players
Sydney FC (A-League Women) players
NJ/NY Gotham FC players
Saint Louis Athletica players
Pali Blues players
Australian LGBT sportspeople
Lesbian sportswomen
LGBT association football players
Western Sydney Wanderers FC (A-League Women) players
Olympic soccer players of Australia
Footballers at the 2004 Summer Olympics
2007 FIFA Women's World Cup players
Australia women's international soccer players
Expatriate women's soccer players in the United States
Women's association football forwards
Women's Professional Soccer players
Soccer players from Sydney
Sportswomen from New South Wales
Australian expatriate sportspeople in the United States
Australian expatriate women's soccer players
Association footballers' wives and girlfriends